Abdelatif Chemlal (born 11 January 1982 in Khouribga) is a Moroccan long-distance runner who specializes in the 3000 metre steeplechase. His personal best time is 8:21.00 minutes, achieved in June 2002 in Seville. He represented his country in the steeplechase at the 2004 Summer Olympics, running in the heats.

He was the bronze medallist in the steeplechase at the 2000 World Junior Championships in Athletics. He followed this up with another bronze at the African Junior Championships in Athletics the next year. In 2004 he won a continental medal on the senior stage, finishing behind David Chemweno and Richard Mateelong to take the bronze.

Chemlal was suspended by the IAAF from December 2004 to December 2006. He returned to international competition at the 2008 IAAF World Cross Country Championships and ran in the heats of the steeplechase at the 2009 World Championships in Athletics.

Achievements

See also
List of sportspeople sanctioned for doping offences

References

External links



1982 births
Living people
Doping cases in athletics
Moroccan male long-distance runners
Moroccan sportspeople in doping cases
Athletes (track and field) at the 2004 Summer Olympics
Olympic athletes of Morocco
Moroccan male steeplechase runners
20th-century Moroccan people
21st-century Moroccan people